Nasrul Koto (born June 10, 1965 in Binjai) is an Indonesian football manager. He is the current manager of Indonesian Premier Division team PS Bengkulu.

Career

Playing
Nasrul Koto was an outstanding performer for Arseto in Premier Division (newly Indonesian Super League).

Coaching
On September 1, 2010 Nasrul Koto was officially appointed as the new coach of Bengkulu City FC.

References

Living people
Indonesian football managers
1965 births